Vegar Landro (born 21 February 1983) is a Norwegian footballer who plays for Bryne FK. He has formerly played for Nest-Sotra, Vadmyra IL, SK Brann, Kongsvinger IL and Løv-Ham.

He got appearances for Brann in Tippeligaen, before moving to Kongsvinger.

He has been capped for Norway u-21.

References

External links
Player profile at B-gjengen.com

1983 births
Living people
Footballers from Bergen
Norwegian footballers
Nest-Sotra Fotball players
SK Brann players
Kongsvinger IL Toppfotball players
Løv-Ham Fotball players
Bryne FK players
Eliteserien players
Norwegian First Division players
Association football defenders